

The Djerring Trail is a shared use path that runs alongside the Cranbourne and Pakenham railway lines in south-eastern Melbourne, Australia. The route serves a total of 13 railway stations.

History
The Djerring Trail was built as a part of the Level Crossing Removal Project, that removed all level crossings between Caufield and Dandenong by raising the rail. 12 kilometres of the new shared path was built, along with existing paths merged into the new ones to form the Djerring Trail. In early 2018, a community vote was held to determine the name of the new path, some alternative options being Kerrboo onool Trail, Urban Parkland Trail, and Eucalyptus Trail. Over 1800 votes were counted. On 26 September 2018, it was revealed that the name 'Djerring trail' had a clear win, taking 30% of the total vote, and its counterpart 'Djerring Rail Trail' came in second, which meant that the name 'Djerring' was clearly preferred.

While consultations of naming were taking place, construction began on the trail in early 2018 as well, alongside the removal of 9 level crossings across the Pakenham and Cranbourne lines.

Trail Route

Caulfield to Carnegie
The trail begins at the end of Dudley Street, just below East Caulfield Reserve. It runs adjacent to the rail line past a connection onto Gibson street and Lorne Street, and a small fitness area underneath the rail line. It then intersects with Grange Road, where there are a set of cycling-prioritised traffic lights. It then continues along past some open space with seating near Girdwood Avenue and Princes Highway. It runs in a straight line, with a connection onto Egan Street, until it intersects with Koornang Road, with another set of cycling-friendly traffic lights. It then reaches the Carnegie Station entrance.

Carnegie to Murrumbeena
It begins running parallel to Carnegie Station and Woorayl Street. It crosses briefly with the entrance to the Carnegie Station carpark. It runs directly underneath the rail line, with connections onto Jersey Parade, Hewitts Road, Oakdene Crescent and Beena Avenue. It then intersects with Murrumbeena Road and reaches Murrumbeena Station.

Murrumbeena to Hughesdale
The trail runs underneath Murrumbeena Station, and then runs parallel to Railway Parade, which also has bike lanes on it. It then connects with Nerrim Road and soon after intersects with the entrance to the Murrumbeena Station carpark. It then runs parallel to Railway Parade and the rail line, connecting with Arthur Street and Ella Street. It then intersects with the Outer Circle Trail, and crosses the entrance to the Hughesdale Station carpark, and then reaches Hughesdale Station.

Hughesdale to Oakleigh
This section begins by crossing Poath Road just next to the Hughesdale Station bus interchange. It briefly curves and then runs parallel alongside the rail line, with a connection onto Willesden Road. Then, it curves south, runs past Galbally Reserve and connects with the Rosstown Railway Heritage Trail. It continues eastwards, with connections onto Richardson Street and Paddington Road, before running underneath Warrigal Road and reaching Oakleigh Station.

Oakleigh to Huntingdale
This section of the trail begins by using the underpass underneath Oakleigh Station to head to the northern end of the station. It runs along the footpath near the vehicle entrance to Oakleigh Central Shopping Centre, then turns off into a small car park, then goes off-road, back alongside the rail line. It runs underneath Hanover Road, and then continues towards Huntingdale Station, with connections on Oxford Street, Downing Street, Westminster Street, and runs past industrial area. It then reaches Huntingdale Station.

Huntingdale to Clayton
The trail runs through the carpark and bus interchange before again becoming off-road. It runs underneath Haughton Road, and parallel to the rail line, with a connection onto Carnish Road. It crosses over the rail line and runs along the south side of the rail line. It curves underneath the rail line, runs past a fitness area and intersects with Clayton Road. It then reaches Clayton Station

Clayton to Westall
The trail curves underneath Clayton Station, and runs alongside the raised rail line, crossing over a bus lane and the Clayton Station carpark entrance. It runs past the Clayton RSL Memorial space, with a connection onto Carnish Road, and later Haughton Road. It then bends until it runs north of the rail line. It runs past two basketball courts and public seating, which is located underneath the rail line, before intersecting with Centre Road. After crossing Centre Road, it runs past the Clayton Urban Park. It then goes parallel with Haughton Road and the rail line, with a connection to Rayhur Street. It curves sharply near Oakes Avenue and then runs alongside Oakes Avenue until it reaches Westall Station.

Westall to Springvale
This section of the trail commences by leaving Westall Station, and crossing underneath Westall Road. It runs with the rail line, connecting with Newcombe Road and Springvale Reserve, as well as Queens Avenue and St Johns Avenue. It then intersects with Springvale Road and reaches Springvale Station.

Springvale to Sandown Park
The trail weaves through the bus interchange and the entrance to the Springvale Station carpark. It curves tightly so it runs adjacent to Lightwood Road. It connects with the Sandown Park Greyhound Racing Track, and then reaches Sandown Park Station.

Sandown Park to Noble Park
The trail continues past Sandown Park Station, connecting to Sandown Raceway. It continues parallel to Lightwood Road and the rail line, intersecting with Corrigan Road. After crossing over the road, there is a connection into the Noble Park dog park and Ross Reserve. It runs alongside an exercise area and a connection into the Ross Reserve car park. It then runs to Heatherton Road, where there are a playground and a skatepark. After crossing Heatherton Road, it runs past the Noble Park Station carpark, and then reaches Noble Park Station.

Noble Park to Yarraman
After leaving Noble Park Station. The route crosses over Leonard Avenue, and after crossing turns sharply to the north side of the rail.  It then passes next to the carpark and goes back to the southern side of the rail, running parallel to Douglas Street and the rail line. It continues, connecting onto Mons Parade and Mile Creek. It intersects with Chandler Road and runs alongside Hanna Road until it reaches Yarraman Station. This is the last section of trail that is not shared with any other paths.

Yarraman to Dandenong
The trail merges with the EastLink Trail, and runs south alongside the EastLink. It crosses over Cheltenham Road, then diverges off the EastLink Trail, and joins with the Dandenong Creek Trail. It follows the Dandenong Creek Trail until Hammond Road, where the footpath is used to get to Dandenong Station.

Connections
The trail directly connects with the Dandenong Creek Trail, as well as the EastLink Trail. Nearby in the north is the Gardiners Creek Trail and the Anniversary Trail. It connects centrally to the Rosstown Rail Trail and a little further south at Huntingdale station, it connects to Monash University - Clayton campus, via the path on North Road.

References 

Footpaths
Melbourne
Pedestrian infrastructure in Australia

Bike paths in Melbourne
Rail trails in Victoria (Australia)